The Imcheon Lee clan is one of the Korean clans. Their bon-gwan is in Buyeo County, South Chungcheong Province. According to the census in 2000, the number of members was 704. Their founder was Yi Hyeon. He was an Uighur and was naturalized at the end of the Goryeo Dynasty. After visiting Nanking as an interpreter for Goryeo, he was given territories in Imcheon as a reward, and began the Imcheon Yi clan.

See also 
 Korean clan names of foreign origin

References

External links 
 

 
Uyghur Khaganate